Ranunculus jovis is a species of buttercup known by the common name Utah buttercup or Jupiter buttercup. It is native to the mountain west of the United States, from Nevada to Wyoming. It is a petite plant, growing a few centimeters tall on hairless stems with a few deeply divided fingerlike leaves at the base. It produces yellow flowers with five rounded petals, yellow stamens around a central nectary.

References

jovis
Flora of North America